Kamrup Metropolitan district is one of the 35 districts in Assam state in north-eastern India. It was carved out of the erstwhile undivided Kamrup district in 2003 and covers an area equivalent to the area under the jurisdiction of the Guwahati Metropolitan Development Authority area. Dispur Legislative Assembly Constituency in Kamrup Metro district with 3.53 lakh voters is the largest constituency in Assam.

History
It was created on 3 February 2003 by bifurcating the erstwhile Kamrup district.

The Government of Assam, during the Chief-ministership of Late Tarun Gogoi, had proposed to bifurcate it further and create a new district, named East Kamrup. In 2016, the process of creation of the district was started. But later that year, the process of creation was stopped midway due to lack of infrastructure.

Geography
Administrative headquarters of Kamrup Metropolitan district is at Guwahati city. The district occupies an area of 1527.84 km².

Climate

Demographics

Population
According to the 2011 census Kamrup Metropolitan district has a population of 1,253,938, roughly equal to the nation of Estonia or the US state of New Hampshire.} This gives it a ranking of 384th in India (out of a total of 640). Its population growth rate over the decade 2001-2011 was 18.95%. Kamrup Metropolitan has a sex ratio of 922 females for every 1000 males, and a literacy rate of 88.66%. Scheduled Castes and Scheduled Tribes make up 8.12% and 5.99% of the population respectively.

Religion 

As of the 2011 census, 84.89% of the population are Hindus, Muslims are 12.05%, Christians are 1.50% and Jains are 0.74% of the population.

Language 

At the time of the 2011 census, 57.87% of the population spoke Assamese, 20.50% Bengali, 10.45% Hindi, 2.39% Nepali, 1.66% Boro and 1.55% Karbi as their first language.

See also

Kamrup Rural district

References

External links
 Kamrup Metropolitan district website

 
Districts of Assam
2003 establishments in Assam
Kamrup region